Madhavaram, is a village in Munagala Taluk of Suryapet district in the state of Telangana in India.

Demographics

References 

Cities and towns in Suryapet district